Gowher Rizvi is a Bangladeshi historian, scholar and academic.
Currently he is the International Affairs adviser to the prime minister of Bangladesh. Prior to that he was  MacArthur Fellow in International Relations at Nuffield College, Oxford University. He was an editor of Contemporary South Asia and a Fellow of the Royal Historical Society. He held various appointments at Oxford University, the University of Warwick, the University of Canterbury, Harvard Kennedy School and the University of Virginia. His publications cover the disciplines of history,  international relations, and public policy.

Early life
Rizvi's ancestors moved from Murshidabad to East Pakistan during the Partition of India. Rizvi spent the early part of his student life in Faujdarhat Cadet College. He passed both BA and MA in the first class from the University of Dhaka. In 1972, he went to Trinity College, Oxford as a Rhodes scholar and garnered a D.Phil. in history.

Rizvi is married to Agnese Barolo. They have one daughter, Maya Barolo Rizvi, a 2008 graduate of Vassar.

Academic career
Rizvi was at St. Antony's College, Oxford as the Alfred Beit Junior Lecturer and senior associate member from 1976 to 1978. From 1979 to 1981 he taught history at Balliol College, Oxford. He was MacArthur Scholar and Fellow in Politics and International Relations at Nuffield College, Oxford from 1988 to 1994. In 1992, he collaborated with the Royal Institute of International Affairs to organize a high-level Anglo-Iranian Roundtable in order to facilitate direct dialogue between senior officials of the two countries. In the same year he taught as Arnold Bernhard Visiting Professor of History at Williams College, Massachusetts. From 1994 to 1995 Professor Rizvi served as the director of contemporary affairs at the Asia Society in New York. In 1995 he joined the Ford Foundation, where he headed their operations in South Asia. In 1998 to 2002 he was appointed the Ford Foundation Representative to New Delhi with responsibilities for directing the foundation's activities in South Asia. From 2002 to 2008 he was a lecturer of Public Policy at Harvard Kennedy School. He was also director of the Ash Center for Democratic Governance and Innovation. In 2008 he was appointed vice provost for international programs at the University of Virginia. In 2009 he has become the International Affairs adviser to Sheikh Hasina Prime Minister of Bangladesh.

Selected publications

References

University of Dhaka alumni
Living people
Faujdarhat Cadet College alumni
1948 births
Fellows of the Royal Historical Society